This is a list of the major honours won by football clubs in Spain. It lists every Spanish association football club to have won any of the domestic and international trophies recognized as major titles by FIFA.

Honours table

 

 

Numbers in bold are Spanish record totals for that competition.

See also
 La Liga
 List of Spanish football champions
 Copa del Rey
 Supercopa de España
 List of UEFA club competition winners
 Football records and statistics in Spain

References

External links
Spain - List of Champions on RSSSF.com
Spain Super Cup Finals on RSSSF.com

Spain by honours
Football clubs in Spain
clubs by honours